Arthur Leonard Clemente (July 7, 1925 – November 22, 2021) was an American politician in the state of Washington. He served the 39th district from 1973 to 1979.

References

1925 births
2021 deaths
People from Hoquiam, Washington
Democratic Party members of the Washington House of Representatives